Judith Olwyn Medlicott  (née Sloan) is a New Zealand lawyer and former Chancellor of the University of Otago.

Early life and education
Medlicott was educated at Otago Girls' High School in Dunedin. She took up her law studies in 1972, after an MA degree, marriage and three children. In 1971, she was one of the eight original members of the Dunedin Collective for Woman.

Medlicott was admitted to the bar in 1975. Both her degrees were completed at the University of Otago.

Career
Medlicott's first position was at Dunedin law firm Cook Allan & Co. in 1975; she was made partner in 1980. In 1986 she left to form her own practice. At this time she also founded OWLS, the Otago Women's Law Society. Her legal work has often centred around issues of significance to women, such as Family Court and relationship property issues. She is also frequently appointed by the Family Court to represent children in custody and welfare cases.

In 1988 Medlicott won the New Zealand Mastermind TV competition.

Medlicott was Chancellor of the University of Otago from 1993 to 1998. She has served on a number of community boards, including Radio New Zealand, the Otago District Health Board, the New Zealand Law Practitioners Disciplinary Tribunal and the Ashburn Hall Charitable Trust.

In 2003, Medlicott was one of 140 prominent New Zealanders who signed a petition seeking a Royal Commission into the controversial conviction of childcare worker Peter Ellis.

Honours and awards
In the 1998 Queen's Birthday Honours, Medlicott was appointed a Companion of the New Zealand Order of Merit, for services to the legal profession, education and the community. The same year she received an honorary doctorate of law from the University of Otago.

In 2014 she was awarded a life membership of OWLS in recognition of her inspirational career and service to the legal community.

References

Living people
20th-century New Zealand lawyers
Chancellors of the University of Otago
New Zealand women lawyers
21st-century New Zealand lawyers
University of Otago alumni
Companions of the New Zealand Order of Merit
People educated at Otago Girls' High School
Contestants on New Zealand game shows
Year of birth missing (living people)
New Zealand feminists
Otago District Health Board members